Muddyfox (formerly Muddy Fox) is a bicycle manufacturing company based in Basildon, England. The company specialises in mountain bikes, also producing road, hybrid, and BMX bikes. Muddy also has a clothing line for cycle sport that includes sportswear (jerseys, jackets, trousers, shorts, gloves). Protection gear and accessories include helmets, sunglasses, pumps and bicycle parts.

Muddyfox is currently a subsidiary of Frasers Group (formerly, "Sports Direct Int.").

History 
Muddyfox was founded by the serial entrepreneur Aristidis Hadjipetrou and Drew Lawson after spotting a gap in the market in the UK for off-road bicycles with stronger frames and chunkier tyres which offered the user more versatility and range, following from the success of developers in America like Gary Fisher  The company developed a successful marketing campaign based around a yellow background with black fox paw prints and were instrumental in reimagining the style of off-road cycling in the UK.

The company produced BMX bikes in the 1980s before a slump in the market forced them to switch to mountain bike production. The company has been a brand of Universal Cycles since 2001, itself since 2009 a majority-owned subsidiary of Sports Direct (current Frasers Group), and produces Silver Fox bicycles for bigbox retailers such as Argos.

References

External links
 

Cycle manufacturers of the United Kingdom
Companies based in Essex
Mountain bike manufacturers
Sports Direct